Ctenopseustis obliquana, the brownheaded leafroller, is a moth of the family Tortricidae. It is native to New Zealand and is an introduced species in Hawaii. The common name is also used for the related species Ctenopseustis herana and Ctenopseustis fraterna.

The wingspan can range up to 25 mm. The coloration and markings on the forewing are extremely variable, ranging from fawn to chocolate  brown with darker markings.

The larvae feed on a wide range of plants, including various broadleaved and coniferous trees and ferns, for instance Eucalyptus, Quercus, Acacia, Larix, Picea, Pinus and Pseudotsuga species. They feed on the leaves, stem and buds of their host plant beneath a protective webbing of silk and foliage. Full-grown larvae are about 20 mm long and translucent green and sometimes pale yellow.

References

External links

Detailed species info

Archipini
Moths of New Zealand